Jason of Nysa (Iason o Nysaevs; 1st-century BC) was a Stoic philosopher, the son of Menecrates, and, on his mother's side, grandson of Posidonius, of whom he was also the disciple and successor at the Stoic school at Rhodes. He therefore flourished after the middle of the 1st century BC. The Suda lists four works of his:
 Βίοι Ἐνδόξων Vii Endoxon – Famous Lives
 Φιλοσόφων Διαδοχαί Filosofon Diadoche – Successions of Philosophers
 Βίος Ἑλλάδος Vios Ellados – Life of Greece, in 4 books
 Περὶ Ῥόδου Peri Rodou – On Rhodes

However, the Suda expresses doubt about whether the third book is his, and also credits Jason of Argos as having written a Life of Greece in 4 books.

Notes

1st-century BC Greek people
1st-century BC philosophers
Ancient Rhodes
Hellenistic-era philosophers from Anatolia
Stoic philosophers